Tshegofatso Godfrey Ramaboea (born ) is a South African rugby union player for [[Falcons (rugby union) in the Currie Cup and the Rugby Challenge. His regular position is wing.

References

South African rugby union players
Living people
1995 births
Rugby union players from Johannesburg
Rugby union wings
Golden Lions players
Griquas (rugby union) players
Falcons (rugby union) players